The Unloved Woman (Spanish: La malquerida) is a 1913 play by the Spanish writer Jacinto Benavente. It has been adapted a number of times for films and television including the 1921 American silent film The Passion Flower, the 1940 Spanish film The Unloved Woman and the 1949 Mexican film The Unloved Woman.

References

Bibliography
 Goble, Alan. The Complete Index to Literary Sources in Film. Walter de Gruyter, 1999.

1913 plays
Spanish plays adapted into films